Prabhupad (প্রভুপাদ) is a Bengali word which means a title of honour. Literally the word Prabhupad means "Lord's Feet" or "Lotus Feet"; see Prabhupāda.

Prabhupad also the name of the following Hindu religious teachers:-

Rupa Goswami Prabhupada (1489–1564)
Bhaktisiddhanta Sarasvati (1874–1937), leader of Gauriya math. The name was used as an honorific by his followers.
A. C. Bhaktivedanta (1896–1977), used as an honorific for the founder of ISKCON by his followers.